Joanna Jarmołowicz (born 19 April 1994) is a Polish actress.

Biography 
In 2013 Jarmołowicz played a small role in short movie Strażnicy, although her feature film debut was in 2016 in the movie Planet Single.

Selected filmography
 Planet Single 3 (2019) as Zośka
 Planet Single 2 (2018) as Zośka
 Na noże (2016) (2016) as Zuza
 Pierwsza miłość (2016) as Marta
 Planet Single (2016) as Zośka
 Radosław II 2014 as Basia
 Sandland (movie)'' 2014 as Anita

References

External links
 
 Joanna Jarmołowicz at filmpolski.pl

1994 births
Living people
21st-century Polish actresses
Polish film actresses